William Roy Shurtleff (born April 28, 1941) also known as Bill Shurtleff is an American researcher and writer about soy foods. Shurtleff and his former wife Akiko Aoyagi have written and published consumer-oriented cookbooks, handbooks for small- and large-scale commercial production, histories, and bibliographies of various soy foods. These books introduced soy foods such as tofu, tempeh, and miso on a wide scale to non-Asian Westerners, and are largely responsible for the establishment of non-Asian soy food manufacturers in the West beginning in the late 1970s. In 1980, Lorna Sass wrote in The New York Times, "The two people most responsible for catapulting tofu from the wok into the frying pan are William Shurtleff and Akiko Aoyagi.” In 1995, Suzanne Hamlin wrote in The New York Times, “At the turn of the century there were two tofu suppliers in the United States. Today there are more than 200 tofu manufacturers...and tofu can be found in nearly every supermarket."

In turn, the new availability and cultural acceptance of tofu and related foods enabled the creation of new manufactured soy-based foods such as Tofutti and Tofurkey, and arguably gave a push to the vegetarian movement in the West that had begun in the late 1960s.

Early life
Shurtleff was born in Oakland, California on April 28, 1941. He attended Stanford University in Palo Alto, where he studied engineering. After work at Stanford, he joined the Peace Corps and taught school in Nigeria. He then joined the Tassajara Zen Center, where he meditated and worked as a cook for  years. Having become interested in soy foods, Shurtleff decided to visit Asia and learn about their manufacture.

In Japan, Shurtleff visited tofu shops and interviewed tofu masters. He met his future wife, Akiko Aoyagi, an illustrator from Tokyo. They became a team, with Aoyagi focused on testing and writing recipes, both Eastern and Western, and providing the technical illustrations for their books. Meanwhile, Shurtleff researched the production and manufacture of the soy products. They soon "decided to do for tofu and other soy foods what Johnny Appleseed did for apples.”

In October 1972 Shurtleff and Aoyagi began full-time research on soy foods in Japan. In 1975 they published their first book, The Book of Tofu. In August 1976 they founded the Soyinfo Center (named Soyfoods Center until 2006) in Lafayette, California.

Major works
All three books have recipes that do not use meat, poultry or fish products, though the authors mention some traditional uses of the soy foods with these ingredients. The books do have recipes that use dairy, eggs, and honey.

The Book of Tofu
The Book of Tofu (1975) is aimed at the general public in the West. It combines a cookbook with Asian and Western recipes, a history of tofu, and descriptions of small-scale producers of tofu in Japan. The book includes sections on related products such as soy milk, okara, fermented tofu and yuba.

The Book of Miso
Shurtleff and Aoyagi researched and wrote a similar book on miso, The Book of Miso (1976). It focused on Japanese miso, with some attention to similar condiments in other Asian cuisines.

The Book of Tempeh
Shurtleff and Aoyagi went to Indonesia to learn about the manufacture of tempeh, and published The Book of Tempeh in 1979. This book focuses on traditional Indonesian types of tempeh and tempeh recipes, but also contains Western recipes that use tempeh. This book built on a very small but established non-Asian constituency in the United States that was making and using tempeh, including The Farm in Tennessee.

Impact of their work
The Book of Tofu sold over 40,000 copies during its first year in print, and almost as many in the second year. By 1980 over 100,000 copies of The Book of Tofu were in print. At that time, their manuals for manufacturers of soy milk and tofu, miso, and tempeh were selling about 125 copies per month.

The new availability of soy foods, including tofu, miso, tempeh, and okara, in turn stimulated commercial production of foods based on them. For example, David Mintz invented the non-dairy, kosher pareve ice cream stubstitute Tofutti in 1981: “It was after he opened his Manhattan restaurant, he said in one of many versions of the story, that "a Jewish hippie" tipped him to the potential of tofu. "The Book of Tofu" (1979), by William Shurtleff and Akiko Aoyagi, became his new bible.”

 their printed and bound books have sold more than 830,000 copies.

Research works and database
Over their careers, Shurtleff and Aoyagi have written, published, and assembled a wide variety of research material on soybeans and soyfoods. These include market studies, histories, technical manuals, and subject- and region-specific bibliographies. The SoyaScan database at the Soyinfo Center contains more than 100,000 documents, many unique. The Soyinfo Center has published 120 books that are available for free digital download.

Their book History of Soybeans and Soyfoods in Africa (1857-2009): Extensively Annotated Bibliography and Sourcebook received the 2011 STS Oberly Award for Bibliography in the Agricultural or Natural Sciences from the American Library Association.

Marriage and family
Shurtleff and Aoyagi married in 1977 and have one child. They divorced in 1995. Aoyagi contributed to their joint publications the many recipes, the covers, and many technical illustrations. She was born in Japan in 1950 and is a 1971 graduate of the Women's College of Art in Tokyo.  she is a freelance illustrator and graphic designer.

Selected works
 Shurtleff, William; Aoyagi, Akiko. The Book of Miso: Food for Mankind. New York: Ballantine Books, 1976; 1981 paperback edition. ISBN 0-345-29107-7.
 Shurtleff, William; Aoyagi, Akiko. The Book of Tofu: Food for Mankind. Vol 1. New York: Ballantine Books, 1979 revised edition. ISBN 0-345-30806-9.
 Shurtleff, William; Aoyagi, Akiko. The Book of Kudzu: A Culinary & Healing Guide. Brookline, MA: Autumn Press, 1977. ISBN 0-394-42068-3.
 Shurtleff, William., Aoyagi, Akiko. Using Tofu, Tempeh & Other Soyfoods in Restaurants, Delis & Cafeterias. Lafayette, CA: Soyfoods Center, 1982. ISBN 9780933332072, 0933332076
 Shurtleff, William; Aoyagi, Akiko. The Book of Tempeh. New York: Harper & Row, 1985 (2nd edition). ISBN 0-06-091265-0.
 Shurtleff, William. Tempeh Production: A Craft and Technical Manual. Lafayette, CA: Soyfoods Center, 1986. ISBN 9780933332232, 0933332238
 Shurtleff, William; Aoyagi, Akiko. Mildred Lager - History of Her Work With Soyfoods and Natural Foods in Los Angeles (1900-1960): Extensively Annotated Bibliography and Sourcebook. Lafayette, CA: Soyinfo Center, 2009. ISBN 978-1-928914-26-6.
 Shurtleff, William; Aoyagi, Akiko. History of Natto and Its Relatives (1405–2012). Lafayette, CA, Soyinfo Center: 2012.
 Shurtleff, William; Aoyagi, Akiko. History of Roasted Whole Soy Flour (Kinako), Soy Coffee, and Soy Chocolate (1540–2012). Lafayette, CA: Soyinfo Center, 2012.
 Shurtleff, William; Aoyagi, Akiko. History of Soybean Crushing: Soy Oil and Soybean Meal (980-2016): Extensively Annotated Bibliography and Sourcebook. Lafayette, CA: Soyinfo Center, 2016.
 Shurtleff, William; Aoyagi, Akiko. History of Soybeans and Soyfoods in the Caribbean/West Indies (1767-2022). Lafayette, CA: Soyinfo Center, 2021.

References

External links
 The SoyInfo Center

1941 births
Living people
American cookbook writers
American food writers
American industrial engineers
American vegetarianism activists
Food historians
Historians of vegetarianism
Stanford University alumni
Technical writers
Vegetarian cookbook writers